Foreign Agent  is a 1942 American spy film directed by William Beaudine. It stars John Shelton, Gale Storm, and Ivan Lebedeff. A young woman in Hollywood foils the attempts of Axis spies to steal an invention.

Cast
John Shelton as Jimmy
Gale Storm as Mitzi Mayo
Ivan Lebedeff as Okura
George Travell as Nick Dancy
Patsy Moran as Joan Collins
Lyle Latell as Eddie McGurk
Hans Schumm as Dr. Werner
William Halligan as Bob Davis
Kenneth Harlan as George McCall
Herbert Rawlinson as Stevens
Boyd Irwin as Elliott Jennings
David Clarke as Carl Beck
Fee Malten as Anna
Edward Peil Sr. as Robert Nelson 
Paul Bryar as Jerry the bartender

References

External links
 
 

1940s spy drama films
American spy drama films
American black-and-white films
Films directed by William Beaudine
Films set in Los Angeles
Monogram Pictures films
World War II films made in wartime
1942 drama films
1942 films
1940s English-language films